The Russian Volleyball Cup in (Russian: Кубок России по волейболу среди мужчин) is the second most important tournament after the national championship in a series of competitions for volleyball clubs in Russia . It has been held since 1993, and then since 2009 it has been named after Konstantin Reva .

Winners list

Titles by club

References

External links
 Всероссийская федерация волейбола